Wilhelm Jahn (24 November 1835 in Dvorce – 21 April 1900 in Vienna) was an Austrian conductor.

Life
Jahn served as director of the Vienna Court Opera from 1880 to 1897 and principal conductor of the Vienna Philharmonic Orchestra from 1882 to 1883. He gave the partial premiere of Bruckner's Symphony No. 6, performing the middle two movements in 1883.

References

1835 births
1900 deaths
People from Bruntál District
Moravian-German people
Austrian conductors (music)
Male conductors (music)
Opera managers
Austrian people of Moravian-German descent
19th-century conductors (music)
19th-century male musicians